ALPHA (alpha-ethyl-3,4-methylenedioxybenzylamine)  is a lesser-known psychedelic drug and a substituted benzylamine. It is also the benzylamine analog of 3,4-methylenedioxyamphetamine (MDA). ALPHA was first synthesized by Alexander Shulgin. In his book PIHKAL on the MDA page, the threshold dosage is listed as 10 mg. At mild threshold dosages (around 10 mg) there are eyes-closed "dreams" with some body tingling, at higher doses (up to 140 mg) was reported to produce a pleasant, positive feeling. This compound is not anoretic at any dose. It lasts about 3 hours. Very little data exists about the pharmacological properties, metabolism, and toxicity of ALPHA.

See also 
 M-ALPHA (N-methyl analogue)
 Indanorex
 Phenethylamine
 Psychedelics, dissociatives and deliriants

References 

Psychedelic drugs